Shadrack Bol Machok is a South Sudanese politician. He was elected to the Lakes State Legislative Assembly in 2010.

In January 2010 he had been named as the reserve for the SPLM candidate Gideon Shulur for the Domuloto seat of the Lakes State Legislative Assembly by the SPLM Lakes State Electoral College Committee. However, he opted to contest the election as an independent instead and won the seat with 4,530 votes (53.96%), defeating Gideon.

References

Living people
Members of the Lakes State Legislative Assembly
Year of birth missing (living people)